Thomas Edward Andrews (born January 11, 1962, in Parma, Ohio) is a former professional American football offensive tackle and center in the  National Football League. He played three seasons in the NFL, two for the Chicago Bears (1984–1985) and one for the Seattle Seahawks (1987). He was a member of the 1985 Bears Super Bowl XX winning team.

Andrews is currently the senior director of development for Papa John's Pizza.

References

1962 births
Living people
People from Parma, Ohio
Players of American football from Ohio
American football offensive guards
Louisville Cardinals football players
Chicago Bears players
Seattle Seahawks players
Sportspeople from Cuyahoga County, Ohio
National Football League replacement players